Volcán Ipala is a stratovolcano in south-eastern Guatemala. Volcán Ipala is part of a cluster of small stratovolcanoes and cinder cone fields in south-eastern Guatemala.

See also
 List of volcanoes in Guatemala

References 
 

Mountains of Guatemala
Volcano
Stratovolcanoes of Guatemala